Testicular cancer is cancer that develops in the testicles, a part of the male reproductive system. Symptoms may include a lump in the testicle or swelling or pain in the scrotum. Treatment may result in infertility.

Risk factors include an undescended testis, family history of the disease, and previous history of testicular cancer. More than 95% are germ cell tumors which are divided into seminomas and non-seminomas. Other types include sex-cord stromal tumors and lymphomas. Diagnosis is typically based on a physical exam, ultrasound, and blood tests. Surgical removal of the testicle with examination under a microscope is then done to determine the type.

Testicular cancer is highly treatable and usually curable. Treatment options may include surgery, radiation therapy, chemotherapy, or stem cell transplantation. Even in cases in which cancer has spread widely, chemotherapy offers a cure rate greater than 80%.

Globally testicular cancer affected about 686,000 people in 2015. That year it resulted in 9,400 deaths up from 7,000 deaths in 1990. Rates are lower in the developing than the developed world. Onset most commonly occurs in males 20 to 34 years old, rarely before 15 years old. The five-year survival rate in the United States is about 95%. Outcomes are better when the disease remains localized.

Signs and symptoms

One of the first signs of testicular cancer is often a lump or swelling in the testes. The U.S. Preventive Services Task Force (USPSTF) recommends against routine screening for testicular cancer in asymptomatic adolescent and adults including routine testicular self-exams. However, the American Cancer Society suggests that some men should examine their testicles monthly, especially if they have a family history of cancer, and the American Urological Association recommends monthly testicular self-examinations for all young men.

Symptoms may also include one or more of the following:
 a lump in one testis which may or may not be painful
 sharp pain or a dull ache in the lower abdomen or scrotum
 a feeling often described as "heaviness" in the scrotum
 firmness of the testicle
 breast enlargement (gynecomastia) from hormonal effects of β-hCG
 low back pain (lumbago) due to the cancer spreading to the lymph nodes along the back

It is not very common for testicular cancer to spread to other organs, apart from the lungs. If it has, however, the following symptoms may be present:
 shortness of breath (dyspnea), cough or coughing up blood (hemoptysis) from metastatic spread to the lungs
 a lump in the neck due to metastases to the lymph nodes

Testicular cancer, cryptorchidism, hypospadias, and poor semen quality make up the syndrome known as testicular dysgenesis syndrome.

Causes
A major risk factor for the development of testis cancer is cryptorchidism (undescended testicles).  It is generally believed that the presence of a tumor contributes to cryptorchidism; when cryptorchidism occurs in conjunction with a tumor then the tumor tends to be large.  Other risk factors include inguinal hernias, Klinefelter syndrome, and mumps orchitis.  Physical activity is associated with decreased risk and sedentary lifestyle is associated with increased risk. Early onset of male characteristics is associated with increased risk.  These may reflect endogenous or environmental hormones. 

Higher rates of testicular cancer in Western nations have been linked to the use of cannabis.

Mechanisms
Most testicular germ cell tumors have too many chromosomes, and most often they are triploid to tetraploid. An isochromosome 12p (the short arm of chromosome 12 on both sides of the same centromere) is present in about 80% of the testicular cancers, and also the other cancers usually have extra material from this chromosome arm through other mechanisms of genomic amplification.

Diagnosis

The main way testicular cancer is diagnosed is via a lump or mass inside a testis. More generally, if a young adult or adolescent has a single enlarged testicle, which may or may not be painful, this should give doctors reason to suspect testicular cancer.

Other conditions may also have symptoms similar to testicular cancer:
 Epididymitis or epididymo-orchitis
 Hematocele
 Varicocele
 Orchitis
 Prostate infections or inflammations (prostatitis), bladder infections or inflammations (cystitis), or kidney (renal) infections (nephritis) or inflammations which have spread to and caused swelling in the vessels of the testicles or scrotum
 Testicular torsion or a hernia
 Infection, inflammation, retro-peritonitis, or other conditions of the lymph nodes or vessels near the scrotum, testicles, pubis, anorectal area, and groin
 Benign tumors or lesions of the testicles
 Metastasis to the testicles from another, primary tumor site(s)

The nature of any palpated lump in the scrotum is often evaluated by scrotal ultrasound, which can determine exact location, size, and some characteristics of the lump, such as cystic vs solid, uniform vs heterogeneous, sharply circumscribed or poorly defined. The extent of the disease is evaluated by CT scans, which are used to locate metastases.

The differential diagnosis of testicular cancer requires examining the histology of tissue obtained from an inguinal orchiectomy - that is, surgical excision of the entire testis along with attached structures (epididymis and spermatic cord). A biopsy should not be performed, as it raises the risk of spreading cancer cells into the scrotum.

Inguinal orchiectomy is the preferred method because it lowers the risk of cancer cells escaping. This is because the lymphatic system of the scrotum, through which white blood cells (and, potentially, cancer cells) flow in and out, links to the lower extremities, while that of the testicle links to the back of the abdominal cavity (the retroperitoneum).  A trans-scrotal biopsy or orchiectomy will potentially leave cancer cells in the scrotum and create two routes for cancer cells to spread, while in an inguinal orchiectomy only the retroperitoneal route exists.

Blood tests are also used to identify and measure tumor markers (usually proteins present in the bloodstream) that are specific to testicular cancer. Alpha-fetoprotein, human chorionic gonadotropin (the "pregnancy hormone"), and LDH-1 are the typical tumor markers used to spot testicular germ cell tumors.

A pregnancy test may be used to detect high levels of chorionic gonadotropin; however, the first sign of testicular cancer is usually a painless lump. Note that only about 25% of seminomas have elevated chorionic gonadotropin, so a pregnancy test is not very sensitive for making out testicular cancer.

Screening
The American Academy of Family Physicians recommends against screening males without symptoms for testicular cancer.

Staging
After removal, the testicle is fixed with Bouin's solution because it better conserves some morphological details such as nuclear conformation. Then the testicular tumor is staged by a pathologist according to the TNM Classification of Malignant Tumors as published in the AJCC Cancer Staging Manual.  Testicular cancer is categorized as being in one of three stages (which have subclassifications).  The size of the tumor in the testis is irrelevant to staging.  In broad terms, testicular cancer is staged as follows:
 Stage I: the cancer remains localized to the testis.
 Stage II: the cancer involves the testis and metastasis to retroperitoneal and/or paraaortic lymph nodes (lymph nodes below the diaphragm).
 Stage III: the cancer involves the testis and metastasis beyond the retroperitoneal and paraaortic lymph nodes.  Stage 3 is further subdivided into non-bulky stage 3 and bulky stage 3.

Further information on the detailed staging system is available on the website of the American Cancer Society.

Classification

Although testicular cancer can be derived from any cell type found in the testicles, more than 95% of testicular cancers are germ cell tumors (GCTs).  Most of the remaining 5% are sex cord–gonadal stromal tumours derived from Leydig cells or Sertoli cells.  Correct diagnosis is necessary to ensure the most effective and appropriate treatment.  To some extent, this can be done via blood tests for tumor markers, but definitive diagnosis requires examination of the histology of a specimen by a pathologist.

Most pathologists use the World Health Organization classification system for testicular tumors:
 Germ cell tumors
 Precursor lesions
 Germ cell neoplasia in situ
 Unclassified type (carcinoma in situ)
 Specified types
 Tumors of one histologic type (pure forms)
 Seminoma
 Variant - Seminoma with syncytiotrophoblastic cells
 Spermatocytic tumor
 Variant - spermatocytic tumor with sarcoma
 Embryonal carcinoma
 Yolk sac tumor
 Trophoblastic tumors
 Choriocarcinoma
 Variant - monophasic choriocarcinoma
 Placental site trophoblastic tumour
 Cystic trophoblastic tumor
 Teratoma
 Variant - Dermoid cyst
 Variant - Epidermoid cyst
 Variant - Monodermal teratoma (Carcinoid), Primitive neuroectodermal tumor (PNET), Nephroblastoma-like tumor, others.
 Variant - Teratomic with somatic-type malignancy
 Tumours of more than one histologic type (mixed forms)
 Embryonal carcinoma and teratoma
 Teratoma and seminoma
 Choriocarcinoma and teratoma. Embryonal carcinoma
 Others
 Sex cord/Gonadal stromal tumors
 Leydig cell tumor
 Sertoli cell tumor
 Lipid rich variant
 Sclerosing variant
 Large cell calcifying variant
 Intratubular Sertoli cell neoplasia in Peutz–Jeghers syndrome
 Granulosa cell tumor
 Adult type
 Juvenile type
 Thecoma fibroma group
 Thecoma
 Fibroma
 Sex cord/gonadal stromal tumor - incompletely differentiated
 Sex cord/gonadal stromal tumor - mixed types
 Mixed germ cell and sex cord/gonadal stromal tumors
 Gonadoblastoma
 Germ cell-sex cord/gonadal stromal tumor, unclassified
 Miscellaneous tumours of the testis
 Lymphomas
 Primary testicular diffuse large B-cell lymphoma
 Mantle cell lymphoma of the testes
 extranodal marginal zone B cell lymphoma of the testes
 Extranodal NK/T-cell lymphoma, nasal type of the testes
 Peripheral T-cell lymphoma of the testes
 activin receptor-like kinase-1–negative anaplastic large cell lymphoma of the testes
 pediatric-type follicular lymphoma of the testes
 Carcinoid
 Tumors of ovarian epithelial types
 Serous tumor of borderline malignancy
 Serous carcinoma
 Well differentiated endometrioid tumor
 Mucinous cystadenoma
 Mucinous cystadenocarcinoma
 Brenner tumor
 Nephroblastoma
 Paraganglioma
 Haematopoietic tumors
 Tumours of collecting ducts and rete
 Adenoma
 Carcinoma
 Tumors of the paratesticular structures
 Adenomatoid tumor
 Malignant and benign mesothelioma
 Adenocarcinoma of the epididymis
 Papillary cystadenoma of the epididymis
 Melanotic neuroectodermal tumor
 Desmoplastic small round cell tumor
 Mesenchymal tumors of the spermatic cord and testicular adnexae
 Lipoma
 Liposarcoma
 Rhabdomyosarcoma
 Aggressive angiomyxoma
 Angiomyofibroblastoma-like tumor (see Myxoma)
 Fibromatosis
 Fibroma
 Solitary fibrous tumor
 Others
 Secondary tumors of the testis

Treatment
The three basic types of treatment are surgery, radiation therapy, and chemotherapy.

Surgery is performed by urologists; radiation therapy is administered by radiation oncologists; and chemotherapy is the work of medical oncologists. In most patients with testicular cancer, the disease is cured readily with minimal long-term morbidity. While treatment success depends on the stage, the average survival rate after five years is around 95%, and stage 1 cancer cases, if monitored properly, have essentially a 100% survival rate.

Testicle removal 
The initial treatment for testicular cancer is surgery to remove the affected testicle (orchiectomy). While it may be possible, in some cases, to remove testicular cancer tumors from a testis while leaving the testis functional, this is almost never done, as the affected testicle usually contains pre-cancerous cells spread throughout the entire testicle. Thus removing the tumor alone without additional treatment greatly increases the risk that another cancer will form in that testicle.

Since only one testis is typically required to maintain fertility, hormone production, and other male functions, the affected testis is almost always removed completely in a procedure called inguinal orchiectomy. (The testicle is almost never removed through the scrotum; an incision is made beneath the belt line in the inguinal area.)  In the UK, the procedure is known as a radical orchidectomy.

Retroperitoneal lymph node dissection
In the case of non-seminomas that appear to be stage I, surgery may be done on the retroperitoneal/paraaortic lymph nodes (in a separate operation) to accurately determine whether the cancer is in stage I or stage II and to reduce the risk that malignant testicular cancer cells that may have metastasized to lymph nodes in the lower abdomen.  This surgery is called retroperitoneal lymph node dissection (RPLND).  However, this approach, while standard in many places, especially the United States, is out of favor due to costs and the high level of expertise required to perform successful surgery. Sperm banking is frequently carried out prior to the procedure (as with chemotherapy), as there is a risk that RPLND may damage the nerves involved in ejaculation, causing ejaculation to occur internally into the bladder rather than externally.

Many patients are instead choosing surveillance, where no further surgery is performed unless tests indicate that the cancer has returned. This approach maintains a high cure rate because of the growing accuracy of surveillance techniques.

Adjuvant treatment 
Since testicular cancers can spread, patients are usually offered adjuvant treatment - in the form of chemotherapy or radiotherapy - to kill any cancerous cells that may exist outside of the affected testicle. The type of adjuvant therapy depends largely on the histology of the tumor (i.e., the size and shape of its cells under the microscope) and the stage of progression at the time of surgery (i.e., how far cells have 'escaped' from the testicle, invaded the surrounding tissue, or spread to the rest of the body). If the cancer is not particularly advanced, patients may be offered careful surveillance by periodic CT scans and blood tests, in place of adjuvant treatment.

Before 1970, survival rates from testicular cancer were low. Since the introduction of adjuvant chemotherapy, chiefly platinum-based drugs like cisplatin and carboplatin, the outlook has improved substantially. Although 7000 to 8000 new cases of testicular cancer occur in the United States yearly, only 400 men are expected to die of the disease.

In the UK, a similar trend has emerged: since improvements in treatment, survival rates have risen rapidly to cure rates of over 95%.

Radiation therapy
Radiation may be used to treat stage II seminoma cancers, or as adjuvant (preventative) therapy in the case of stage I seminomas, to minimize the likelihood that tiny, non-detectable tumors exist and will spread (in the inguinal and para-aortic lymph nodes).  Radiation is ineffective against and is therefore never used as a primary therapy for non-seminoma.

Chemotherapy

Non-seminoma 

Chemotherapy is the standard treatment for non-seminoma when the cancer has spread to other parts of the body (that is, stage 2B or 3).  The standard chemotherapy protocol is three, or sometimes four, rounds of Bleomycin-Etoposide-Cisplatin (BEP). BEP as a first-line treatment was first reported by Professor Michael Peckham in 1983. The landmark trial published in 1987 which established BEP as the optimum treatment was conducted by Dr. Lawrence Einhorn at Indiana University. An alternative, equally effective treatment involves the use of four cycles of Etoposide-Cisplatin (EP).

Lymph node surgery may also be performed after chemotherapy to remove masses left behind (stage 2B or more advanced), particularly in the cases of large non-seminomas.

Seminoma 

As an adjuvant treatment, use of chemotherapy as an alternative to radiation therapy in the treatment of seminoma is increasing, because radiation therapy appears to have more significant long-term side effects (for example, internal scarring, increased risks of secondary malignancies, etc.).  Two doses, or occasionally a single dose of carboplatin, typically delivered three weeks apart, is proving to be a successful adjuvant treatment, with recurrence rates in the same ranges as those of radiotherapy. The concept of carboplatin as a single-dose therapy was developed by Tim Oliver, Professor of Medical Oncology at Barts and The London School of Medicine and Dentistry. However, very long-term data on the efficacy of adjuvant carboplatin in this setting do not exist.

Since seminoma can recur decades after the primary tumor is removed, patients receiving adjuvant chemotherapy should remain vigilant and not assume they are cured 5 years after treatment.

Prognosis
Treatment of testicular cancer is one of the success stories of modern medicine, with sustained response to treatment in more than 90% of cases, regardless of stage. In 2011 overall cure rates of more than 95% were reported, and 80% for metastatic disease—the best response by any solid tumor, with improved survival being attributed primarily to effective chemotherapy.  By 2013 more than 96 per cent of the 2,300 men diagnosed each year in the U.K. were deemed cured, a rise by almost a third since the 1970s, the improvement attributed substantially to the chemotherapy drug cisplatin. In the United States, when the disease is treated while it is still localized, more than 99% of people survive 5 years.

Surveillance
For many patients with stage I cancer, adjuvant (preventative) therapy following surgery may not be appropriate and patients will undergo surveillance instead. The form this surveillance takes, e.g. the type and frequency of investigations and the length time it should continue, will depend on the type of cancer (non-seminoma or seminoma), but the aim is to avoid unnecessary treatments in the many patients who are cured by their surgery, and ensure that any relapses with metastases (secondary cancers) are detected early and cured. This approach ensures that chemotherapy and or radiotherapy is only given to the patients that need it. The number of patients ultimately cured is the same using surveillance as post-operative "adjuvant" treatments, but the patients have to be prepared to follow a prolonged series of visits and tests.

For both non-seminomas and seminomas, surveillance tests generally include physical examination, blood tests for tumor markers, chest x-rays and CT scanning.  However, the requirements of a surveillance program differ according to the type of disease since, for seminoma patients, relapses can occur later, and blood tests are not as good at indicating relapse.

CT scans are performed on the abdomen (and sometimes the pelvis) and also the chest in some hospitals. Chest x-rays are increasingly preferred for the lungs as they give sufficient detail combined with a lower false-positive rate and significantly smaller radiation dose than CT.

The frequency of CT scans during surveillance should ensure that relapses are detected at an early stage while minimizing the radiation exposure.

For patients treated for stage I non-seminoma, a randomized trial (Medical Research Council TE08) showed that, when combined with the standard surveillance tests described above, 2 CT scans at 3 and 12 months were as good as 5 over 2 years in detecting relapse at an early stage.

For patients treated for stage I seminoma who choose surveillance rather than undergoing adjuvant therapy, there have been no randomized trials to determine the optimum frequency of scans and visits, and the schedules vary very widely across the world, and within individual countries. In the UK there is an ongoing clinical trial called TRISST. This is assessing how often scans should take place and whether magnetic resonance imaging (MRI) can be used instead of CT scans. MRI is being investigated because it does not expose the patient to radiation and so, if it is shown to be as good at detecting relapses, it may be preferable to CT.

For more advanced stages of testicular cancer, and for those cases in which radiation therapy or chemotherapy was administered, the extent of monitoring (tests) after treatment will vary on the basis of the circumstances, but normally should be done for five years in uncomplicated cases and for longer in those with higher risks of relapse.

Fertility
A man with one remaining testis may maintain fertile.  However, sperm banking may be appropriate for men who still plan to have children, since fertility may be adversely affected by chemotherapy and/or radiotherapy.  A man who loses both testicles will be infertile after the procedure, though he may elect to bank viable, cancer-free sperm prior to the procedure.

Epidemiology
Globally testicular cancer resulted in 8,300 deaths in 2013 up from 7,000 deaths in 1990. Testicular cancer has the highest prevalence in the U.S. and Europe, and is uncommon in Asia and Africa.  Worldwide incidence has doubled since the 1960s, with the highest rates of prevalence in Scandinavia, Germany, and New Zealand.

Although testicular cancer is most common among men aged 15–40 years, it has three peaks: infancy through the age of four as teratomas and yolk sac tumors, ages 25–40 years as post-pubertal seminomas and non-seminomas, and from age 60 as spermatocytic tumors.

Germ cell tumors of the testis are the most common cancer in young men between the ages of 15 and 35 years.

United States
In the United States, about 8,900 cases are diagnosed a year. The risk of testicular cancer in white men is approximately 4-5 times the risk in black men, and more than three times that of Asian American men. The risk of testicular cancer in Latinos and American Indians is between that of white and Asian men. The cause of these differences is unknown.

United Kingdom
In the UK, approximately 2,000 people are diagnosed a year. Over a lifetime, the risk is roughly 1 in 200 (0.5%). It is the 16th most common cancer in men. It accounts for less than 1% of cancer deaths in men (around 60 men died in 2012).

Other animals
Testicular tumors occur also in other animals.  In horses, these include interstitial cell tumors and teratomas.  Typically, the former are found in older stallions (affected stallions may become extremely vicious, suggesting excessive production of androgen), and the latter are found in young horses and are large.

References

External links 

 Ball Checker, self-exam app from the Testicular Cancer Society
 Testicular Cancer – detailed guide from the American Cancer Society
 Testicular Cancer – National Health Service information and resource page (UK)
 Testicular cancer statistics from Cancer Research UK

Men's health
Wikipedia medicine articles ready to translate
Testicle disorders
Urological neoplasia